Yadgarovo (Yäźgär) is a rural locality (a village) in Volostnovsky Selsoviet, Kugarchinsky District, Bashkortostan, Russia. The population was 3 as of 2010. There is 1 street.

Geography 
Yadgarovo is located 44 km west of Mrakovo (the district's administrative centre) by road. Yulbashevo is the nearest rural locality.

References 

Rural localities in Kugarchinsky District